The 1945 Istanbul Football Cup season was the 4th season of the cup. Fenerbahçe SK won the cup for the first time. The tournament was single-elimination.

Season

Quarterfinals

|}

Semifinals

|}

Final
November 16, 1945
Attendance:15,000
Şeref Stadium

|}
Goal For Fenerbahçe SK: Naci Bastoncu(2 min.)

References

Istanbul Football Cup
Istanbul